Byrne v Boadle (2 Hurl. & Colt. 722, 159 Eng. Rep. 299, 1863) is an English tort law case that first applied the doctrine of res ipsa loquitur.

Facts
A  barrel of flour fell from a second-story loft  and hit the plaintiff on his head. Though there were two witnesses who saw the injury, there were no witnesses as to how the barrel fell out and hit the plaintiff. Under these conditions, the plaintiff was not required to provide direct evidence as to whether the person responsible for the barrel had breached his duty of care.

Judgment
Initially, in the lower court the case was non-suited through a direct verdict because the plaintiff could provide no evidence.
Subsequently the appellate court concluded  that under the conditions, the fact of the accident itself provided sufficient circumstantial evidence to establish the breach of a duty of care. Baron Pollock said the following.

Notes

External links
 Text of case

English tort case law
1863 in case law
1863 in British law
Exchequer of Pleas cases